Kammavanpettai is a village near Vellore, Tamil Nadu,  India. The Indian Army has a number of recruits from the Vellore district (especially from Kammavanpet, which is known as "the military village") and military spending is a major sources of income.

Kammavanpettai Village Youngsters Every Morning they getup and Practice Running and Workout for Physical fitness to Enrollment in Indian Army, Navy, Air Force & Defence.

References 

Villages in Vellore district